Kleenex/LiLiPUT (also referred to as LiLiPUT) is a compilation album by Swiss punk rock band LiLiPUT. Released by Off Course Records in 1993, the album compiles the band's entire recorded output, from their first recordings under the name Kleenex to their later material after changing their name to LiLiPUT.

The album was reissued by Kill Rock Stars on 20 February 2001.

Track listing

Personnel
Credits are adapted from the album's liner notes.

LiLiPUT
 Lislot Ha (Lieselotte Hafner) – drums (disc one: tracks 1–19)
 Klaudia Schiff (Klaudia Schifferle) – bass, vocals, drums (disc two: tracks 1–11), guitar (disc two)
 Regula Sing – vocals (disc one: tracks 1–10)
 Marlene Marder (Marlene Marti) – guitar, bass (disc two), noises (disc two: tracks 1–11), percussion (disc two: tracks 1–11), vocals (disc one: tracks 20, 21)
 Chrigle Freund – vocals (disc one: tracks 11–21), drums (disc one: tracks 20, 21)
 Angie Barrack – saxophone (disc one: tracks 11–19), vocals (disc one: tracks 11–19)
 Christoph Herzog – saxophone (disc one: tracks 22–24)
 Beat Schlatter – drums (disc one: tracks 22–24; disc two: tracks 20–22)
 Astrid Spirit (Astrid Spirig) – vocals (disc one: tracks 22–24; disc two), bass (disc two: tracks 1–11), percussion (disc one: tracks 22–24; disc two), violin (disc two)

Additional musicians
 Major (Klaus Heuser) – bongos (disc two: tracks 15, 20, 22)
 Juliana Müller – piano (disc two: tracks 14, 17)
 Susanne Müller – saxophone (disc two: track 20)

Production
 Bob Broglia – recording (disc one: tracks 9, 10)
 Etienne Conod – recording (disc one: tracks 1–8, 11–14)
 Dr. Rolf Schmidt – remastering
 Schweizer Radio DRS – recording (disc one: tracks 11–19)
 Röbel Vogel – recording (disc one: tracks 20, 21)
 Harry Zindel – recording (disc two)

Design
 Katja Becker – photography
 Byland & Zuber Graficdesign – graphic design
 LiLiPUT – photography
 Livio Piatti – photography
 Klaudia Schiff – cover artwork

References

External links
 

1993 compilation albums
Post-punk compilation albums
Punk rock compilation albums